En concert is the first live album by Mylène Farmer, released on 4 December 1989. It retraces her two first albums, Cendres de lune and Ainsi soit je... and contains a cover, "Je voudrais tant que tu comprennes", originally sung by Marie Laforêt.

Background
From May 1989, Farmer began a series of concerts through all France, which was successful. After these performances, a live album, mixed by Thierry Rogen, was eventually recorded on 20 and 21 October 1989 in Brussels. The photos, made by Marianne Rosenstiehl, illustrate the booklet with images from various shows of the singer on stage. The album was released on 4 December 1989. It was the last album edited by Bertrand Le Page for Mylène Farmer, because he was later dismissed.
 
A video of the concert, released in May 1990, was directed by Laurent Boutonnat who added to the concert some rather morbid sequences, such as satanic monks and cemeteries, giving thus to the video the look of a film. The editing was produced over a period of one year and was criticized, because certain scenes were re-filmed without the audience.

Two singles were released to promote En concert - what was rather rare at the time for a live album: "Allan" and "Plus grandir", which had a minor success, but were much aired in nightclubs. The album also contains the live version of a song which didn't appear then on Farmer's albums, "À quoi je sers...", and a cover version of Marie Laforêt's song, "Je voudrais tant que tu comprennes".

Critical reception

En concert was generally well received in media. For example, The Mag stated that this album is "a beautiful technical and musical performance". TV Hebdo considered that this album is "loan of emotion". La Voix du Nord qualified it as "real present", containing "the most successful songs" of Farmer, with a "very class presentation" and a booklet of photos. As for France Soir, it said that it is a very "beautiful object". However, according to French journalist Caroline Bee, "the production, a little bit smooth, does not pass on completely the emotion and the strength which emanated from the blazing show".

Commercial performance
The album debuted at number 18 on 3 January 1990, on the French Album Chart. It was then number 15, then number nine, which was its peak position. It remained in the top ten for two months and in the top 20 for seven months. It fell off the top 40 after ten months. and was certified Double Gold album by the SNEP for 200,000 units sold. On 18 March 2005, the album, then released in a digipack version, re-entered the chart for four weeks, peaking at number 106.

Track listing

CD/vinyl

Disc one
 "Prologue" (5:50)
 "L'Horloge" (4:47)
 "Plus grandir" (4:50)
 "Sans logique" (5:06)
 "Maman a tort" (6:20)
 "Déshabillez-moi" (3:56)
 "Puisque..." (8:15)
 "Pourvu qu'elles soient douces" (8:58)
 "Allan" (6:50)

Disc two
 "À quoi je sers..." (5:05)
 "Sans contrefaçon" (6:10)
 "Jardin de Vienne" (6:00)
 "Tristana" (8:12)
 "Ainsi soit je..." (7:49)
 "Libertine" (12:07)
 "Mouvements de Lune" (Part 1) (4:09)
 "Je voudrais tant que tu comprennes" (4:03)
 "Mouvements de Lune" (Part 2) (5:11)

VHS

 "Prologue" (6:00)
 "L'Horloge" (4:30)
 "Sans logique" (5:00)
 "Maman a tort" (6:00)
 "Déshabillez-moi" (3:45)
 "Puisque..." (5:00)
 "Pourvu qu'elles soient douces" (8:00)
 "À quoi je sers..." (5:00)
 "Sans contrefaçon" (6:00)
 "Jardin de Vienne" (5:30)
 "Tristana" (8:00)
 "Ainsi soit je..." (7:40)
 "Libertine" (12:00)
 "Je voudrais tant que tu comprennes" (4:00)
 "Mouvements de Lune"  (5:00)

Note
Does not contain "Plus grandir and "Allan" (they are added on Les Clips Vol. III).

Personnel

 Musicians:
 Keyboards: Bruno Fontaine
 Drums: Yves Sanna
 Percussion: Philippe Drai
 Guitars: Slim Pezin
 Bass: Christian Podovan
 Cello: Jean-Philippe Audin
 Background vocals: Carole Fredericks, Beckie Bell
 Sound: Thierry Rogen
 Mixed by Thierry Rogen
 Mastering and engraving: André Perriat / Top Master
 Photos: Marianne Rosenstiehl / Sygma
 Design: Jean-Paul Théodule

 Editions:
 Requiem Publishing: "Prologue"
 Bertrand Le Page / Polygram Music: "L'Horloge", "Plus grandir", "Sans logique", "Pourvu qu'elles soient douces", "Allan", "Sans contrefaçon", "Jardin de Vienne", "Tristana", "Ainsi soit je...", "Libertine"
 Bertrand Le Page / Cézame: "Maman a tort"
 Intersong - Paris: "Déshabillez-moi"
 Requiem Publishing / Bertrand Le Page: "Puisque...", "À quoi je sers...", "Mouvements de lune"
 Métropolitaines: "Je voudrais tant que tu comprennes"
 Recorded at Studio Mobile "Le Voyageur II" / Yves Jaget
 Mixed at Studio Mega
 Produced by Laurent Boutonnat

Charts

Weekly charts

Year-end charts

Certifications and sales

Formats
Audio
 Double 12" 1
 Double CD
 Double CD (only one case)
 Cassette 1

Note:1 Does not contain "Déshabillez-moi" and "Mouvements de lune (Part I)"

Video
 VHS
 VHS - Limited edition (+ Best of live)
 VHS - Polygram edition
 12" Laserdisc

References

Mylène Farmer live albums
Mylène Farmer video albums
1989 live albums
Live video albums
1989 video albums
Polydor Records live albums
Polydor Records video albums
Music in Brussels